C47 is a secondary route in Namibia that runs from Okakarara to the abandoned Otjituuo airfield in the Otjozondjupa Region.

References 

Roads in Namibia